Litiana Lawedrau (born 9 October 1992) is a Fijian rugby union player.

Lawedrau made her Fijiana XV's debut against Papua New Guinea at the 2016 Oceania Championship on the 5th of November in Suva, Fiji. She scored the first try in the 19th minute of the first half. She later played in the repechage match against Hong Kong to qualify for the 2017 Rugby World Cup.

In 2022, Lawedrau was named in the Fijiana Drua squad for Super W. She made the starting line-up for the Drua's debut in the competition, they played against the Melbourne Rebels. She was later dropped from the squad entirely for breaching camp rules.

References 

1992 births
Living people
Female rugby union players
Fijian female rugby union players
Fiji women's international rugby union players
Fiji international women's rugby sevens players